The Woodbridge Masonic Lodge No. 131 is a historic building located in Woodbridge, California. The building was designed by architect Charles Beasley and was built in 1882 to serve as a meeting hall for Woodbridge Lodge No. 131, a local chapter of the Freemasons.  

The building was listed on the National Register of Historic Places in 1989.  The building was described in its NRHP nomination as "a unique example of the nineteenth century Gothic Revival style...expressed in a very controlled and geometric [way]."

References

Clubhouses on the National Register of Historic Places in California
Gothic Revival architecture in California
Masonic buildings completed in 1882
Buildings and structures in San Joaquin County, California
Masonic buildings in California
National Register of Historic Places in San Joaquin County, California